Elmer Carl Nelson (June 1, 1900 – March 31, 1975) was an American political figure who served as the chairman of the Massachusetts Republican State Committee from 1953 to 1956, a delegate to the 1956 Republican National Convention from Massachusetts, and the Republican nominee for Lieutenant Governor of Massachusetts in 1958. He was a resident of Mendon, Massachusetts.

Early life
Nelson was born on June 1, 1900 in Woonsocket, Rhode Island. He graduated from Milford High School in Milford, Massachusetts. During his senior year he enlisted in the United States Army. He served in the 26th Division, 101st Engineer Battalion during World War I. In 1929 he opened a Buick dealership in Milford.

Political career
Nelson represented the 8th Worcester District in the Massachusetts House of Representatives from 1933 to 1937. He served as vice chairman of the Special Commission on Taxation. He managed Leverett Saltonstall's successful 1938 gubernatorial campaign. He then served as volunteer aide to Saltonstall and was seen as the Governor's patronage chief. From 1939 to 1942, Nelson was a state racing commissioner. During World War II he was a captain in the United States Army.

Nelson managed Christian Herter's 1952 gubernatorial campaign and in 1953, with Herter's support, was elected chairman of the Massachusetts Republican Party. He was given a $12,000-a-year salary, becoming the party's first paid chairman. In 1956, the party's presumptive gubernatorial nominee, Sumner G. Whittier demanded Nelson's resignation, which he refused. He was defeated for reelection by Ralph H. Bonnell at that year's party convention. In 1958, Nelson was the Republican nominee for Lieutenant Governor. He lost to Democrat Robert F. Murphy 60% to 39%. Nelson led his third successful gubernatorial campaign when he managed John Volpe's 1964 campaign.

Death
Nelson died on March 31, 1975 at Milford Hospital.

See also
 1933–1934 Massachusetts legislature
 1935–1936 Massachusetts legislature

References

1900 births
1975 deaths
Massachusetts automobile salespeople
American campaign managers
Massachusetts Republican Party chairs
Members of the Massachusetts House of Representatives
People from Mendon, Massachusetts
People from Milford, Massachusetts
United States Army personnel of World War I
United States Army personnel of World War II